Amy Garvey may refer to:

Amy Ashwood Garvey, Pan-Africanist activist and first wife of Marcus Garvey
Amy Jacques Garvey, Pan-Africanist writer and second wife of Marcus Garvey